George M. Humphrey was a Democratic member of the Wisconsin State Assembly in 1848. He represented the district which included the Towns of Oconomowoc, Ottawa, Summit and Warren Humphrey was a native of New Berlin, Wisconsin. He would be succeeded by fellow Democrat D. Henry Rockwell.

References

External links
The Political Graveyard

People from New Berlin, Wisconsin
Year of birth missing
Year of death missing
Democratic Party members of the Wisconsin State Assembly